Khera is a clan of Jats.

Notable people
Notable people with the surname, who may or may not be affiliated with the clan, include:
 Kamal Khera (born 1989), Canadian politician
 Shiv Khera, Indian author, activist, motivational speaker and politician
 Reetika Khera, Indian economist and social activist
 Manish Khera, Indian entrepreneur 
 Rajesh Khera (born 1968), Indian actor 
 Shamoly Khera, Indian television personality

See also
 Khaira (surname)

References

Surnames
Indian surnames
Surnames of Indian origin